Zongo is a surname, and people with the surname include:

Amy Zongo (born 1980), French athlete
Anatole Zongo Kuyo (born 1963), Ivorian athlete
Boureima Zongo (born 1972), Burkinabé football player
Ernest Zongo (born 1964), Burkinabé cyclist
Henri Zongo (died 1989), Burkinabé politician and military officer
Issa Zongo (born 1980), Burkinabé football player
Jonathan Zongo (born 1989), Burkinabé football player
Mamadou Zongo (born 1980), Burkinabé football player
Masibusane Zongo (born 1990), South African football player
Moïse Zongo (born 1996), Burkinabé football player 
Norbert Zongo (1949–1998), Burkinabé journalist
Ousmane Zongo (died 2003), Burkinabé art trader 
Ousseni Zongo (born 1984), Burkinabé football player 
Tertius Zongo (born 1957), Burkinabé politician and diplomat

See also
 Zongo
Surnames of Burkinabé origin